The Inheritance from New York (German:Die Erbschaft von New York) is a 1919 German silent film directed by Wolfgang Neff and starring Bruno Eichgrün.

Cast
In alphabetical order
 Siegmund Aschenbach as Van den Laar - Kaffeekönig  
 Bruno Eichgrün as Nick Carter  
 Erwin Fichtner as Henrik  
 Hanna Holl as Lou Renard - Artistin  
 Gerhard Ritterband as Bobby

References

External links

 Nitrate Film Interest Group

1919 films
Films of the Weimar Republic
Films directed by Wolfgang Neff
German silent feature films
German black-and-white films
Nick Carter (literary character)
1910s German films